Hungary competed at the 2002 Winter Paralympics in Salt Lake City, United States. One competitor, Sandor Navratyil, from Hungary won no medals and so did not place in the medal table.

See also 
 Hungary at the Paralympics
 Hungary at the 2002 Winter Olympics

References 

2002
2002 in Hungarian sport
Nations at the 2002 Winter Paralympics